Samoylovsky District is an administrative and municipal district (raion), one of the thirty-eight in Saratov Oblast, Russia. It is located in the west of the oblast. Its administrative center is the urban locality (a work settlement) of Samoylovka. Population: 21,451 (2010 Census);  The population of Samoylovka accounts for 35.3% of the district's total population.

References

Notes

Sources

Districts of Saratov Oblast